Dan Fylstra is a pioneer of the software products industry.

A graduate of the Massachusetts Institute of Technology, in 1975 he was a founding associate editor of Byte magazine. In 1978 he co-founded Personal Software, and that year reviewed the Commodore PET 2001 and TRS-80 Model I for Byte while studying for an MBA at the Harvard Business School, having ordered each almost immediately after release. Personal Software became the distributor of a new program called VisiCalc, the first-ever computer spreadsheet. In his marketing efforts Fylstra ran teaser ads in Byte that asked, considering electronic spreadsheets were an entirely new product category, "How did you ever do without it?"

The VisiCalc-Apple connection suggested the hypothesis of the "killer app"—or the "software tail that wags the hardware dog."  Once VisiCalc caught on, people came into computer stores asking for VisiCalc and then also the computer (the Apple II) they would need to run the program.  VisiCalc sales exceeded 700,000 units by 1983.

Fylstra's software products company, later called VisiCorp, was the #1 personal-computer software publisher in 1981 with $20 million in revenues as well as in 1982 with $35 million (exceeding Microsoft which became the largest such firm in 1983).

Fylstra is the former president of Sierra Sciences, and is currently president of software vendor Frontline Systems.  He joined the Libertarian Party in 1998.

References

External links
 Opening Pandora's Box: An Open Letter about the Politicization of the PC Industry by Dan Fylstra.
 Photo of Dan Fylstra with VisiOn and VisiCalc – Computer History Museum
 

Year of birth missing
Living people
Members of the Libertarian Party (United States)
Massachusetts Institute of Technology alumni
Harvard Business School alumni